Len or LEN may refer to:

People and fictional characters
 Len (given name), a list of people and fictional characters
 Lén, a character from Irish mythology
 Alex Len (born 1993), Ukrainian basketball player
 Mr. Len, American hip hop DJ
Len Kagamine, Vocaloid

LEN
 The Lake Erie and Northern Railway, a defunct interurban electric railway in Ontario, Canada
 Len Industri, an Indonesian electronics company known formerly as LEN
 Ligue Européenne de Natation, the European Swimming League
 LEN Trophy

Codes
 len, ISO 639-3 code for the extinct Lencan languages of Central America
 LEN, IATA airport code of León Airport, near León, Spain
 LEN, ICAO airline code for Lentini Aviation - see List of airline codes (L)

Other uses
 Len (band), a Canadian indie rock group
 Len (Norway), an important Norwegian administrative entity during 1536–1814
 Len (programming), a function that gives the length of a text string in some dialects of BASIC programming language
 River Len, a river in the English county of Kent

See also
 Lens (disambiguation)
 Liquid Len, British lighting designer